Three naval ships of the United States have been named Corwin after Secretary of the Treasury Thomas Corwin.

 , was a side-wheel gunboat, wooden steamer built at Philadelphia, Pennsylvania in 1849.
  was a revenue cutter built at Portland, Oregon, by the Oregon Iron Works in 1876.
  was a Coast Guard patrol boat built in Michigan at the Defoe Boat and Motor Works in 1925.

Sources
 

United States Navy ship names